

References

Sources

Further reading
Rhett Butler; The 1871 Lāna‘i Earthquake in the Hawaiian Islands. Seismological Research Letters doi: https://doi.org/10.1785/0220200220

 
Earthquakes
Hawaii
Tsunamis in the United States